The Staunton Braves are a collegiate summer baseball team in Staunton, Virginia.  They play in the southern division of the Valley Baseball League. They have won the pennant in 1993–1995, 1997–2000, 2003, and 2015, ranking as high as the 7th best team in the country during the 2015 regular season. They were league champions in 1995, 1996, and 1999. 

The Braves consistently rank towards the top of the league in attendance and play their home games at historic John Moxie Stadium in Gypsy Hill Park. In 2016, Moxie Stadium was listed as the fifth-best Collegiate Wood Bat Park in all of America, in an article on Scout.com.

The Staunton Braves have had over 40 players drafted in the MLB draft.

Notable players
Aubrey Huff
Chad Tracy
Chris Perez
Jason Michaels
Luke Scott
Shawn Camp
Jon Jay
Gaby Sánchez
Will Harris
Jason Michaels
Matt Fox
Tim Sexton
Mike Maroth
Joe Koshansky
Scott Copeland
Ben Verlander
Max Povse
Sam Howard
Tyler Zombro

References

External links
Staunton Braves
Valley Baseball League

Amateur baseball teams in Virginia
Valley Baseball League teams
Staunton, Virginia
Baseball teams established in 1915
1915 establishments in Virginia